OSAT may refer to:

Open-source appropriate technology
Outsource semiconductor assembly and test, see Semiconductor consolidation

See also
Osat, in Bosnia and Herzegovina
One School at a Time (OSAAT)